Bernd Baron von Maydell (1934–2018), also Berend F. von Maydell, was a German lawyer and secondary school teacher, who specialised in social law.

Life 
Bernd Baron von Maydell, also Berend F. von Maydell, was born on 19 July 1934 in Tallinn

After his resettlement from Estonia to the province of Posen and his schooling there, Maydell fled to the west with his family in February 1945 and settled in Hesse. He graduated from secondary school in 1954 at the Friedrich Wilhelm School in Eschwege. He then studied law and economics at Marburg and Berlin. His first law degree was awarded in 1958, his doctorate at the University of Marburg was awarded in the summer of 1960.

Thereafter von Maydell became a research fellow and lecturer at Bonn University. His habilitation took place in 1971 in the subjects of civil law, employment law and social law.

In 1975 von Maydell accepted the chair for social law at the Free University of Berlin, which he held until 1981. He then moved to the University of Bonn and became a full professor of civil law, employment and social law. There he also headed the university's Institute of Employment and Social Security Law. From 1990 to 1992 he was spokesman for the research training group "European and International Business Law".

In February 1992 von Maydell took over the management of the Max Planck Institute for Social Law and Social Policy founded by Hans F. Zacher in Munich. Since then he has also held an honorary professorship at the Ludwig Maximilian University in Munich and the University of Munich. He also advised Central and Eastern European countries on social reform issues after the end of the Cold War and the dissolution of the Eastern Bloc.

After his retirement at the end of July 2002, von Maydell continued and expanded his advisory work on an international level. He also participated in the expert committee of the Bertelsmann Foundation "Zielen in den Altenpolitik". He died on 3 May 2018.

Honours and distinctions 
 Order of Merit of the Federal Republic of Germany, 1st class
 Order of the Sacred Treasure, Gold Rays (Japan)
 Heinrich Lünendonk Medal for special services in the field of social security
 Visiting scientific member of the Polish Academy of Sciences, Warsaw
 Officer's Cross of the Order of Merit of the Republic of Poland
 Honorary doctorate from the University of Gdańsk
 Medal of cooperation of the Estonian Evangelical Lutheran Church

Works (selection) 
 Inhalt und Funktionen eines modernen Volksgruppenrechtes. Dargestellt am Anspruch der Volksgruppen auf eigene Schulen in Deutschland. Marburg, Rechts- und staatswissenschaftliche Fakultät, dissertation, 28 July 1960.
 Geldschuld und Geldwert. Die Bedeutung von Änderungen des Geldwertes für die Geldschulden. Reihe Schriften des Instituts für Arbeits- und Wirtschaftsrecht der Universität zu Köln. Band 32. Zugleich: Bonn, Univ., Rechts- u. Staatswissenschaftliche Fakultät, Habilschrift. 1971/72. C. H. Beck. Munich. 1974. 
 zusammen mit Wolfhart Burdenski, Walter Schellhorn: Kommentar zum Sozialgesetzbuch, Allgemeiner Teil. Luchterhand. Neuwied. 1976. 
 Zusammenarbeit der Leistungsträger und ihre Beziehungen zu Dritten. GK-SGB X 3. Reihe Gemeinschaftskommentar zum Sozialgesetzbuch. Luchterhand. Neuwied. 1984. 
 with Friederike Wütscher (ed.): Enabling social Europe. Reihe Wissenschaftsethik und Technikfolgenbeurteilung. Vol. 26. Springer Verlag. Berlin, Heidelberg, New York. 2006. 
 with Peter Axer, Franz Ruland, Ulrich Becker (eds.): Sozialrechtshandbuch (SRH). 5th edn.. Nomos-Verlag. Baden-Baden. 2012.

Literature 
 Festgabe zum 60. Geburtstag. In: Zeitschrift für Sozialreform (ZSR). Issue 7, Jul 1994.
 Winfried Boecken (ed.): Sozialrecht und Sozialpolitik in Deutschland und Europa. Festschrift für Bernd Baron von Maydell. Luchterhand. Neuwied. 2002. 
 
 Franz Ruland: Bernd Baron von Maydell (1934–2018) – ein Nachruf, in: NZS 2018, 488.
Boecken/Borchert/Breuer/Eylert/Knieps/Kreikebohm/Kretschmer/Kunze/Majerski-Pahlen/Steinmeyer: Obituary for Prof. Dr. Bernd Baron von Maydell,  in: NZS 2018, 570.

External links

References 

Social law
Academic staff of the University of Bonn
Academic staff of the Free University of Berlin
Members of the Polish Academy of Sciences
Max Planck Society people
Officers Crosses of the Order of Merit of the Federal Republic of Germany
Recipients of the Order of the Sacred Treasure
Officers of the Order of Merit of the Republic of Poland
Baltic-German people
1934 births
2018 deaths